Marikamba Temple may refer to:

 Marikamba Temple, Sagar, a Hindu temple completed around 1596
 Marikamba Temple, Sirsi, a Hindu temple completed in 1688